Valerian Gaprindashvili (December 21, 1888 – January 31, 1941) was a Georgian poet and translator whose early, Symbolist, poetry was of much influence on development of Georgian metaphor and verse.

Born in Kutaisi, he graduated from the Moscow University in 1914. Returning to Georgia, Gaprindashvili was one of the founder members of the Symbolist group Blue Horns in 1915/16. His early, innovating poems illustrate the world as a mystic show populated with phantoms and doubles mixed with nearly "sacral" heroes from history and literature such as Cagliostro, Hamlet, Ophelia, Hannibal, etc. His first and best book, Daisebi ("Sundowns", 1919), at a time he called "the Dionysian night" of Georgia, introduced into Georgian the aesthetics of Baudelaire and Paul Valéry, as well as the mannerisms of the Russian Symbolists. Gaprindashvili significantly distanced himself from the Georgian literary classics’ understanding of a poet's mission and suggested an outcast, mad and suicidal person as an eventual result of a poet's natural evolution. From the 1920s, like many of his fellow Symbolists, he faced an ideological pressure from the newly established Soviet regime which forced him to make a conciliatory move towards the standards of Soviet literature. He survived Stalinist purges of the 1930s, but his later years were unproductive.

Gaprindashvili also made translations from Eugène Edine Pottier, Goethe, Pushkin, Lermontov, Alexander Blok, Nikolay Nekrasov, Vladimir Mayakovsky, and others. He also translated and published in Russian the works of the Georgian Romanticist poet Nikoloz Baratashvili.

References 

Robert B. Pynsent, Sonia I. Kanikova (1993), Reader's Encyclopedia of Eastern European Literature, p. 120. Harpercollins,

External links 
Sentimental Triolet in Georgian and parallel English translation with video

1888 births
1941 deaths
Burials at Didube Pantheon
Male poets from Georgia (country)
Symbolist poets
People from Kutaisi
20th-century poets from Georgia (country)
20th-century translators
20th-century male writers